Serasan Island is an island in the Natuna Regency, Riau Islands, Indonesia. The island is split between two districts, the Serasan District is on the west side and Serasan Timur is on the east side. On March 6, 2023, heavy rainfall created landslides on the island, killing 15 and leaving many more missing. The island hosts the critically endangered Natuna Islands Tarsier, which is endemic to the islands and whose population is declining rapidly.

References

 
Populated places in Indonesia
Islands of Indonesia